Rony Padilla is a contempoary worship music singer, songwriter and worship pastor from Honduras, Central America. 
He leads the Mission Ministry at Trinity Church, Harrow, in North West London. Rony leads the new "Union Church, Totteridge Mission Project" which aims to relaunch Union Church into the Totteridge & Woodside Park community.

Biography
Padilla began studying the piano at the age of 9 and attended the "Escuela Metropolitana de Musica" (Metropolitan School of Music) in San Pedro Sula. At the age of 16, he became a Christian and during that time he wrote his first songs which are lyrically focused on matters concerned with the Christian faith. Padilla has also worked in commercials, jingles and voice-over material for some of Honduras's top Christian radio stations.

Career 
At the end of 2010, Rony became the first Latin American musician to record a live CD/DVD in the United Kingdom; hundreds of people gathered on a live concert at the "Rock Tower" in Islington, London. In June 2012 Rony became the first Latin American singer to perform at the "Big Church Festival", the biggest one-day Christian event in the United Kingdom.

In June 23, 2012 Padilla performed at the HMV Hammersmith Apollo in London, as part of the headlining and supporting acts for Muyiwa Olarewaju. Most recently, he has worked with artists like Evan Craft and Miel San Marcos.

Discography 
 2008 - Todo Por Cambiar.
 2011 - Rony Padilla Live in London.
 2015 - Altar Of Worship.
 2017 - Único Que Salva (feat. Evan Craft) 
 2018 - Tú Eres Santo (feat. Josh Morales de Miel San Marcos) 
 2022 - Todo A Cristo

References
 

Honduran composers
Male composers
Honduran musicians